Chicago has long had a gay neighborhood. Beginning in the 1920s there was active homosexual nightlife in Towertown, adjacent to the Water Tower. Increasing rents forced gay-friendly establishments steadily northwards, moving through Old Town and Lincoln Park along Clark Street and on to Boys Town. Boys Town presently serves as the best-known Chicago gayborhood, and the center of its LGBT culture. Gentrification has pushed many gay and lesbian people to reside ever further north into Uptown, Edgewater and Rogers Park.

Politics
In 1961 Illinois was the first state to repeal its sodomy law. Effective LGBT political involvement began in the 1960s alongside the civil rights movement, with organizations such as Chicago Gay Liberation. In 1965, Mattachine Midwest was founded as a gay rights organization following the Fun Lounge police raid the previous year.

The Chicago Gay and Lesbian Democrats was the main LGBT political group of the 1980s. LGBT interest groups and the Democratic Party have facilitated LGBT political involvement in Chicago.

Throughout the 1960s, 1970s, and 1980s, Chuck Renslow was one of the main pioneers for Chicago's LGBT community through his advocacy for inclusion, and fought alongside the Democratic party to push for non-discrimination amongst LGBT individuals in Chicago. Renslow was also widely known for his long-running leather bar, which was also one of the first opened in Chicago, and his world-renowned provocative male photography that earned him a spot in the Chicago LGBT Hall Of Fame.

In 1983, Mayor of Chicago candidate Jane Byrne promised to support LGBT issues, so the Chicago Gay and Lesbian Democrats endorsed Byrne. However Harold Washington won the Democratic Party primary. At that point the LGBT voters began to support Washington, and they helped him win the general election. LGBT voters supported Washington during his re-election in 1987 because, during his previous term, he supported LGBT causes and criticized homophobia. The following year, in 1988, he signed into law an anti-discrimination ordinance for the city of Chicago.

ACT UP/Chicago was an organization dedicated to improving the lives of people with AIDS. It often criticized Mayor of Chicago Richard M. Daley. It later became a part of the Chicago LGBT Hall of Fame.

Institutions
 Center on Halsted, LGBT community center
 Howard Brown Health Center, LGBT health care center
 Windy City Black Pride, LGBT-related assistance and events serving African-American communities
 Chicago Gay and Lesbian Hall of Fame, honors LGBT individuals
 National Gay and Lesbian Sports Hall of Fame
 Leather Archives and Museum, collects and exhibits artifacts related to LGBT leather subculture
 Gerber/Hart Library, largest circulating library of gay and lesbian titles in the Midwestern United States

See also
Legacy Walk, an outdoor public display in Chicago which celebrates LGBT contributions
Boystown, section of Lakeview was the first officially recognized gay village in the United States

Media
Newspapers Chicago Gay Crusader (now defunct) and Windy City Times have served LGBT readers.  Windy City Radio is the city's only LGBT radio station.  Online guide ChicagoPride.com is a news and events website for the Chicago/Midwest LGBT community.

Recreation
 Pride Arts Center 
 The Chicago Pride Parade, the annual gay pride parade in June; over a million people now participate in the pride festivities
 Reeling: The Chicago LGBTQ International Film Festival, founded in 1981
 Chicago Gay Men's Chorus, founded in 1983
 Bijou Theater

References

Further reading

 
 
 .

External links
 Daily (and first) online LGBT Guide to Chicago - ChicagoPride.com
 LGBT Guide to Chicago
 "LGBT Community Action Plan" - City of Chicago
 Reeling LGBT Film Festival
 "The 5 Best LGBT Bars" (Archive). Chicago. February 2013.
Chicago Gay History

 
Demographics of Chicago